Qi Faren (born 1933) is a Chinese aerospace engineer and the chief designer for Chinese spacecraft since the launch of the prototype Shenzhou manned spacecraft in 1999.

Qi was born in 1933 in Wafangdian, Liaoning, China, and graduated from the Beijing Institute of Aeronautics and Astronautics in 1957. Qi took part in the research and design of the People's Republic of China's first satellite - the Dong Fang Hong I, which was successfully launched, and stayed in orbit, in 1970. He was then appointed the general designer of China's spacecraft in 1992, following the retirement of Qian Xuesen.

Qi is an academician of the Chinese Academy of Engineering and the International Academy of Astronautics. He was inducted into the International Astronautical Federation Hall of Fame in 2019, the third Chinese inductee after Wang Xiji and Long Lehao.

References 

1933 births
Living people
Shenzhou program
Beihang University alumni
Chinese aerospace engineers
People from Wafangdian
Engineers from Liaoning
Members of the Chinese Academy of Engineering